This is a new event on the 2013 ITF Women's Circuit.

Victoria Kan won the tournament, defeating Nastja Kolar in the final, 6–4, 6–4.

Seeds

Main draw

Finals

Top half

Bottom half

References 
 Main draw

Soho Square Ladies Tournament - Singles